The Eight Immortals are a group of legendary xian ("immortals") in Chinese mythology. Each immortal's power can be transferred to a vessel that can bestow life or destroy evil. Together, these eight vessels are called the "Covert Eight Immortals". Most of them are said to have been born in the Tang or Song Dynasty. They are revered by the Taoists and are also a popular element in secular Chinese culture. They are said to live on a group of five islands in the Bohai Sea, which includes Mount Penglai.

The Immortals are:
 He Xiangu, in modern context generally seen as the only female of the group, often depicted holding a lotus flower.
 Cao Guojiu, related to a Song dynasty emperor before he became an immortal.
 Li Tieguai, considered to be mentally disturbed and associated with medicine and easing the suffering of the sick and needy, identified by his iron crutch and Calabash bottle.
 Lan Caihe, originally pictured as female later developed an ambiguous or more accurately, a "transformative" gender and is considered the patron of florists and gardeners.
 Lü Dongbin, a scholar and poet considered to be the leader of the Eight Immortals.
 Han Xiangzi, a flute artist.
 Zhang Guolao, a fangshi symbol of longevity.
 Zhongli Quan, associated with death and the power to create silver and gold, often depicted holding a fan.

In literature before the 1970s, they were sometimes translated as the Eight Genies. First described in the Yuan Dynasty, they were probably named after the Eight Immortal Scholars of the Han.

In art
While cults dedicated to various Taoist immortals date back to the Han dynasty, the popular and well-known Eight Immortals first appeared in the Jin dynasty. The art of the Jin tombs of the 12th and 13th centuries depicts a group of eight Taoist immortals in wall murals and sculptures. They officially became known as the Eight Immortals in the writings and works of art of the Taoist group known as the Complete Realization (Quanshen). The most famous art depiction of the Eight Immortals from this period is a mural of them in the Eternal Joy Temple (Yongle Gong) at Ruicheng.

The Eight Immortals are considered to be signs of prosperity and longevity, so they are popular themes in ancient and medieval art. They were frequent adornments on celadon vases. They were also common in sculptures owned by the nobility. Many silk paintings, wall murals, and wood block prints remain of the Eight Immortals. They were often depicted either together in one group, or alone to give more homage to that specific immortal.

An interesting feature of early Eight Immortal artwork is that they are often accompanied by jade hand maidens, commonly depicted servants of the higher ranked deities, or other images showing great spiritual power. During the Ming and Qing dynasties, the Eight Immortals were frequently associated with other prominent spiritual deities in artwork. There are numerous paintings with them and the Three Stars (the gods of longevity, prosperity, and good fortune) together. Also, other deities, such as the Queen Mother of the West, are commonly seen in the company of the Eight Immortals.

The artwork of the Eight Immortals is not limited to paintings or other visual arts. They are quite prominent in written works too. Authors and playwrights have written numerous stories and plays on the Eight Immortals. One famous story that has been rewritten many times and turned into several plays (the most famous written by Mu Zhiyuan in the Yuan Dynasty) is The Yellow-Millet Dream, which is the story of how Lǚ Dòngbīn met Zhongli Quan and began his path to immortality.

In literature

The Immortals are the subject of many artistic creations, such as paintings and sculptures. Examples of writings about them include:

 The Yueyang Tower by Ma Zhiyuan
 The Bamboo-leaved Boat by Fan Zi'an
 The Willow in the South of the City by Gu Zijing
 The most significant is The Eight Immortals Depart and Travel to the East by Wu Yuantai in the Ming Dynasty.
 There is another work, also made during the Ming (c. 14th–15th centuries), by an anonymous writer, called The Eight Immortals Cross the Sea. It is about the Immortals on their way to attend the Conference of the Magical Peach when they encounter an ocean. Instead of relying on their clouds to get them across, Lü Dongbin suggested that they each should exercise their unique powers to get across. Derived from this, the Chinese proverb "The Eight Immortals cross the sea, each reveals its divine powers" indicates the situation that everybody shows off their skills and expertise to achieve a common goal.

In qigong and martial arts
Furthermore, they have been linked to the initial development of qigong exercises such as the Eight Piece Brocade. There are some Chinese martial arts styles named after them, which use fighting techniques that are attributed to the characteristics of each immortal. Some drunken boxing styles make extensive use of the Eight Immortals archetypes for conditioning, qigong/meditation and combat training.  One subsection of BaYingQuan drunken fist training includes methodologies for each of the eight immortals.

Worship
Established in the Song Dynasty, the Xi'an temple Eight Immortals Palace, formerly Eight Immortals Nunnery, is where statues of the Immortals can be found in the Hall of Eight Immortals. There are many other shrines dedicated to them throughout China and Taiwan. In Singapore, the Xian'gu Temple is dedicated to the Immortal Lady He from the group as its focus of devotion.

Depictions in popular culture

The Immortals are the subject of many depictions in popular culture, including:
 In Jackie Chan's films Drunken Master and Drunken Master II, there are eight "drunken" Chinese martial arts forms that are said to be originated from the Eight Immortals. At first, the protagonist did not want to learn the Immortal Lady He form because he saw it as feminine, but he eventually created his own version of it.
 The 1998–99 Singaporean television series Legend of the Eight Immortals was based on stories of the Eight Immortals and adapted from the novel Dong You Ji.
 The Eight Immortals play an important part in the plot of the video game Fear Effect 2.
 In the Andy Seto graphic novel series Saint Legend, the Eight Immortals reappear to protect the Buddhist faith from evil spirits set on destroying it.
 In the X-Men comic book, the Eight Immortals appear to protect China along with the Collective Man when the mutant Xorn caused a massacre in one small village.
 In the Immortal Iron Fist comic book, there are seven supreme kung fu practitioners, called the Seven Immortal Weapons. They each hail from other-dimensional cities and must fight for their city's chance to appear on Earth. Aside from being named the "Immortal" Weapons, the most overt reference to the Eight Immortals is that one Immortal Weapon, Fat Cobra, hails from and represents a city called "Peng Lai Island".
 In the roleplaying game Feng Shui, the Eight Immortals appear in the sourcebook Thorns of the Lotus.
 The Eight Immortals played a role in the animated show Jackie Chan Adventures. In the show, the Immortals were said to be the ones who defeated the Eight Demon Sorcerers and sealed them away in the netherworld using items that symbolized their powers. They then crafted the Pan'ku box as a key to opening the portals that lead into the demons' prison. Later on in the series, the items the Immortals used to seal away the demons the first time are revealed to have absorbed some of the demons' chi and become the targets of Drago, the son of Shendu (one of the Demon Sorcerers), to enhance his own powers.
 In The Forbidden Kingdom, Jackie Chan plays the character Lu Yan, who is supposed to be one of the Eight Immortals, as revealed by the director in the movie's special feature, The Monkey King and The Eight Immortals.
 In the Tales of the Dragon expansion for Age of Mythology, the Eight Immortals are hero units for the Chinese.
 In The Iron Druid Chronicles, Zhang Guolao joins the party journeying to Asgard to slay Thor in vengeance for the Norse gods crimes.  Zhang Guolao's grudge stems from Thor killing his donkey in a trick.

References

Further reading
 Lai, T. C., The Eight Immortals (Swindon Book Co., 1972).
 Mantak Chia, Johnathon Dao, The Eight Immortal Healers: Taoist Wisdom for Radiant Health (Simon and Schuster).

External links
 
 Stories and Myths of Eight Immortals. A collection of Eight Immortals stories

 
Chinese deities
Chinese art
Taoist art
Taoist immortals
Chinese iconography